Quiz Whizz is a 1958 short subject directed by Jules White starring American slapstick comedy team The Three Stooges (Moe Howard, Larry Fine and Joe Besser). It is the 183rd entry in the series released by Columbia Pictures starring the comedians, who released 190 shorts for the studio between 1934 and 1959.

Plot
Quiz show winner Joe is taken to the cleaners by con men G. Y. Prince (Milton Frome) and R. O. Broad (Bill Brauer) by investing his winnings in Consolidated Fujiyama California Smog Bags. The Stooges head to their offices to get Joe's money back. Instead, they find two sympathetic businessmen (the two crooks, in disguise) who offer to pay back the losses if Moe, Larry and Joe will pose as juvenile wards for a rich and eccentric millionaire, Montgomery M. Montgomery (Gene Roth) and his scheming wife, Lisa (Greta Thyssen). But Montgomery is actually Prince's and Broad's gang leader, and plotting to kill the Stooges. The Stooges go along with the game, with Larry and Moe playing blind man's bluff, while Joe is forced to eat his big cigar, until they discover the scheme and knock out the crooks. However, when the Stooges split the check into thirds, they have to paste it back together.

Production notes
Filmed on May 2–3, 1957, Quiz Whizz features Moe and Larry's more "gentlemanly" haircuts, first suggested by Joe Besser. However, these had to be used sparingly, as most of the shorts with Besser were remakes of earlier films, and new footage had to be matched with old. However, in Quiz Whizz, Larry's frizz is combed back, while Moe retained his sugarbowl bangs.

This film marks the return of supporting actor Harold Brauer and it is his only appearance in a Joe Besser film.

Quotes
 Moe (frantically): "I'd like to report a missing person. Name? Joe Besser. Height? Well, he's about 5-foot-5 by 5-foot-5. Color of hair? Skin!"

See also
 List of American films of 1958

References

External links 
 
 
 Quiz Whizz at threestooges.net

1958 films
1958 comedy films
The Three Stooges films
American black-and-white films
Films directed by Jules White
Columbia Pictures short films
1950s English-language films
1950s American films